Thierry Mouyouma (born 27 September 1975) is a Gabonese former football defender and current manager.  He made several appearances for the Gabon national football team.

Career
He spent his early career with MangaSport, FC 105 Libreville, Étoile du Sahel, CO Medenine, Stade Reims, Canon Yaoundé, Leixões SC and FC Felgueiras.

In 2003, Mouyouma moved to South Africa, joining Wits University from FC Felgueiras.

After he retired from playing, Mouyouma became a football coach. He manages his former club, FC 105 Libreville.

References

1975 births
Living people
Gabonese footballers
Gabon international footballers
Association football defenders
F.C. Felgueiras players
Cape Town Spurs F.C. players
FC 105 Libreville players
Expatriate footballers in Portugal
Expatriate soccer players in South Africa
Expatriate footballers in Bahrain
Gabonese expatriate sportspeople in Portugal
2000 African Cup of Nations players
Bidvest Wits F.C. players
CO Médenine players
21st-century Gabonese people